A silver rush is the silver-mining equivalent of a gold rush, where the discovery of silver-bearing ore sparks a mass migration of individuals seeking wealth in the new mining region.

Notable silver rushes have taken place in Mexico, Chile, the United States (Colorado, Nevada, California, Utah), and Canada (Cobalt, Ontario, and the Kootenay district of British Columbia).  Several famous tourist towns owe their existence to silver rushes.

History

Historically there were other "silver rushes", such as on the Attic peninsula near Athens, Greece, thousands of years ago. The silver mines of Laurion became famous for their  exploitation and helped fund the new state of Athens. The term is also widely applied to the New World. Despite the larger-than-life image of the gold rush, the history of towns and industry in the North American West revolves much more around silver.  This is partly because of the other minerals usually found with it – lead, tin, copper – and the more complicated smelting process associated with it because of the chemical complexity of its ores (usually galena).  The line between a smelter town and a silver mining town is very slim in many cases, although copper mining towns typically also have large smelters (such as Anaconda, Montana) and industrial complexes associated with them.

The pursuit for silver often opens up other mineral deposits for development because of the variety of other useful ores that occur with it, especially in galena, its most common natural form.  Hence the Boundary Country of British Columbia, just across the international border from Spokane, Washington, had a strong mining and smelting economy based on the non-silver components of galena, and the nearby city of Trail remains a functioning smelter town (long after the long-established industrial complex of the Boundary District has faded into a ghost town).

Hardrock mines tend to last longer than placer gold mines, and so silver mining towns last longer and have more time to develop than placer gold rush towns, which often peak within a few years.  Silver mining towns typically last a few decades, with time to develop the opulence and luxury that only left the slightest traces in placer gold-fevered places such as Dawson City in the Klondike.  By contrast, "silver cities" like Aspen, Colorado, and Nelson, British Columbia, often survived as functioning economies into the era of modernization and the advent of tourism (which sometimes proves richer than any silver mine).

Examples

Canada
British Columbia
 Nelson, British Columbia, 1887
 Kaslo, British Columbia, circa 1889
 Slocan, British Columbia, "the Silvery Slocan", 1892

Ontario
 Cobalt, Ontario, "The Silver Capital of Canada", 1903

Chile
 Agua Amarga, 1811
 Chilean silver rush, Norte Chico, 1832-1840s)
Chañarcillo, 1832
Tres Puntas, 1848

Germany
 First Berggeschrey, Saxony, Ore Mountains, 1168
 Second Berggeschrey, Saxony, Ore Mountains, 1470
 Harz Mountains, Kingdom of Hanover

Mexico
Sonora
 Planchas de Plata district, 1736

Zacatecas
Zacatecas, 1549

United States

California
 Calico Mountains (California)

Colorado

 Argentine district, 1865
 Aspen, Colorado
 Caribou, Colorado, 1869
 Telluride, Colorado
 Leadville, Colorado, 1879

Nevada

 Comstock Lode, 1859 
 Gold Hill and Virginia City
 Tonopah, Nevada, 1900

Utah
 Silver Reef, Utah

See also 

 Gold rush 
 Silver standard
 Silver as an investment
 Sierra de la Plata, a mythic silver mountain

References

Economic history
History of mining
Silver mining